Hesp is a surname. Notable people with the surname include:

Danny Hesp (born 1969), Dutch football defender
Ruud Hesp (born 1965), Dutch football goalkeeper